Elosa is a genus of rotifers belonging to the family Trichocercidae.

The species of this genus are found in Europe.

Species:
 Elosa spinifera Wiszniewski, 1932 
 Elosa worrallii Lord, 1891

References

Ploima